Střížovice is a municipality and village in Kroměříž District in the Zlín Region of the Czech Republic. It has about 200 inhabitants.

Geography
It lies in a mainly agricultural landscape on the border between the Chřiby range and Upper Morava Valley. The Morava River forms the eastern municipal border.

History
The first written mention of Střížovice is from 1365.

Sights
The most notable sights are a statue of Saint Florian from 1723, a belfry from the 18th century, and a chapel from the 18th century.

References

External links

Villages in Kroměříž District